The Church of Jesus Christ of Latter-day Saints in Madagascar refers to the Church of Jesus Christ of Latter-day Saints (LDS Church) and its members in Madagascar. In 1990, a small congregation was created in Madagascar. In 2021, there were 13,547 members in 42 congregations.

History

The first branch of the LDS Church in Madagascar was organized in 1990 with Razanapanala Ramianadrisoa as president. Ramiandrisoa had joined the LDS Church in France while studying there in 1986. The first LDS missionaries to enter Madagascar were Fred L. Forsgren and his wife Eileen who arrived in March 1991. The Church was legally recognized by the government of Madagascar in 1993.

Until 1998 missionary work in Madagascar was supervised from South Africa, but a separate mission for Madagascar was organized in 1998. The first LDS Church-built meetinghouse in Madagascar was completed in May 1999.

The Book of Mormon was translated to Malagasy in 2000. Also that year the first stake in Madagascar, the Antananarivo Madagascar Stake was organized with Dominique L. Andriamanantoa as president.

In 2016, an outbreak of pneumonic and bubonic plague caused 80 nonnative missionaries to leave the island. In 2020, the LDS Church temporarily canceled services and other public gatherings in response to the spread of the coronavirus pandemic which resumed online and/or in person, depending on the congregation.

Stakes and Districts

Congregations in Madagascar not part of a stake or district include:
Ambositra Branch
Anjoma Branch
Fianarantsoa Branch
Madagascar Antananarivo Mission Branch
Mahajanga Branch
Moramanga Branch
Tsianolondroa Branch
Tulear Branch

The Madagascar Antananarivo Mission Branch serves families and individuals in Madagascar that is not in proximity of a meetinghouse.

Mission
The Madagascar Antananarivo Mission was created on 1 July 1998 as a division of the South Africa Durban and the South Africa Johannesburg Missions. The Madagascar Antananarivo Mission encompasses all of The Madagascar, Mauritius, and Reunion.

Mauritius
The LDS Church reported 552 members in 3 congregations in Mauritius for year-end 2021. The Mauritius District consists of the Flacq Branch, Phoenix Branch, and Rose Hill Branch.

Reunion
The LDS Church reported 552 members in 4 congregations and 5 family history centers in Reunion for year-end 2021. The St Denis Reunion District consists of the Le Port Branch, St Denis Branch, St Marie Branch, and St Pierre Branch. Family history centers are located at each of those meetinghouses.

Temples
As of February 2023, Madagascar is in the Johannesburg South Africa Temple District. On October 3, 2021, in the Saturday Afternoon session of General Conference, Church President Russell M. Nelson announced the Antananarivo Madagascar Temple.

See also

 Religion in Madagascar

References

External links
 Newsroom (Madagascar) - Facts and Statistics
 The Church of Jesus Christ of Latter-day Saints Official site

Churches in Madagascar
Madagascar
1990 establishments in Madagascar